Joshua Query is an American politician from Manchester, New Hampshire who has served as a member of the New Hampshire House of Representatives since 2018. They represent the Hillsborough 16th District as a member of the Democratic Party. Query identifies as genderqueer, and uses they/them pronouns.

Electoral history

References

21st-century American politicians
Gay politicians
People with non-binary gender identities
LGBT state legislators in New Hampshire
Living people
Democratic Party members of the New Hampshire House of Representatives
Politicians from Manchester, New Hampshire
Year of birth missing (living people)
Non-binary politicians